Whole Hog Café is a restaurant chain based in Little Rock, Arkansas.  It offers barbecue along with side dishes including potato salad, beans, coleslaw, salad, and dinner rolls.  Other specialties include barbecue nachos and loaded baked potatoes. Currently there are fifteen locations, some corporate and some franchised.  There are restaurants in Arkansas, Missouri, New Mexico, and New Jersey.

Whole Hog Café has been featured on Food Network's Rachael Ray's Tasty Travels.

History 
Competing as the Southern Gentlemen's Culinary Society, founders Ron Blasingame, Mike "Sarge" Davis, and Steve Lucchi submitted their barbecue in several competitions eventually winning the Memphis in May World Championship Barbecue Cooking Contest in 2002.

On September 22, 2009, Ron Blasingame died at the age of 60.

Locations

Arkansas 
Bentonville
Conway
Fayetteville
Fort Smith
Bryant
Little Rock
North Little Rock

Missouri 
Springfield

New Mexico 
Albuquerque
Santa Fe

New Jersey
Cherry Hill
Medford

References

External links 
Whole Hog Café

Companies based in Little Rock, Arkansas
Restaurant chains in the United States
Companies based in Arkansas